Gafurov or Ghafurov is a masculine surname common in Uzbekistan, Tajikistan and nearby countries. Its feminine counterpart is Gafurova or Ghafurova. It may refer to
Anvar Gafurov (born 1982), Uzbekistani football player 
Bobojon Ghafurov (1908–1977), Tajik historian
Husniddin Gafurov (born 1994), Uzbekistani football player 
Rashidjon Gafurov (born 1977), Uzbekistani football midfielder
Renat Gafurov (born 1982), Russian motorcycle speedway rider
Said Gafurov (born 1967), Russian economist, orientalist and administrator

See also
 Ghafurov